Korpijärvi is a medium-sized lake in the Vuoksi main catchment area. It is located in the region Southern Savonia of Finland.

Korpijärvi is divided in two parts, which are called Valtolanselkä and Halmeniemenselkä. Between them is Tommolansalmi strait, and the Finnish National Road 15 crosses the lake there.

In Finland there are 40 lakes that are called Korpijärvi. This is the biggest of them.

See also
List of lakes in Finland

References

Lakes of Mäntyharju